This list of natural gas fields includes major fields of the past and present.

N.B. Some of the items listed are basins or projects that comprise many fields (e.g. Sakhalin has three fields: Chayvo, Odoptu, and Arkutun-Dagi).

25 Largest conventional non-associated gas fields 

''Table sources:

Notes: 
Gasfields are non-associated gas and condensate fields.
Size refers to ultimate recoverable reserves (including past production) expressed in trillion cubic feet.

By location
 Algeria
 Hassi R'mel

 Australia
 Bass Strait
 Jansz
 Greater Gorgon
 Browse Venture (
 North West Shelf Venture
 Yolla gas field
 Fairview, Scotia, Spring Gully, Bowen Basin

 Azerbaijan
 Shah Deniz gas field

 Bahrain
 Awali

 Bolivia (~1.5×1012 m³)
 Margarita
 Sabalo
 San Alberto
 Itau

 Brazil
 Albacora-Leste oil field
 Jupiter gas field (17 x 10¹²) cu ft ( 480 km³))
 Marlin gas field
 Tupi oil field

 Burma
 Zawtica
 Shwe Gas (located in Rakhine state)

 Canada
 Sable Offshore Energy Project
 Elsuort
 Kopanoar
 King Kristian
 Greater Sierra
 Hekla gas field (7.5 198×109m³)
 Drake Point
 Medicine Hat
 Provost, Alberta (town)

 China
 Canxue gas field
 Chunxiao gas field
 Duanqiao gas field
 Karamay
 Shiyugou Dunxi
 Sulige
 Tianwaitian gas field

 Cyprus
 Aphrodite gas field
 Calypso gas field
 Glaucos 1 gas field
 Onisiforos gas field
 Cronos 1 gas field
 Zeus 1 gas field

 Ecuador
 Amistad gas field

 Egypt
 Nile Delta Basin
New finding in the Nile Delta Basin of )
 Wakar
 Temsah
 Ras El Barr
 Halawa
 Kafr Al Shaikh
 Zohr

 Ethiopia
 Ogaden Basin (68×106m³)

 France
 Lacq

 Hungary
 Makó gas field (22-)

 India
 Krishna Godavari Basin KG-D6 gas field

 Indonesia
 Arun gas field, depleted 14 sep 2015.
 Mahakam gas field
 Peciko gas field
 Sakakemang gas field
 Tangguh gas field
 Tuna gas field

 Iran
 South Pars
 North Pars
 Kish Gas Field
 Golshan Gas Field (45 - )
 Tabnak
 Kangan
 Farsi (11-)
 Nar
 Aghar
 Khangiran
 Ahwaz Field
 Ferdowsi Gas Field
 Aghajari Field
 Gachsaran Field

 Iraq
 Kirkuk Field
 Akkas gas field

 Ireland
 Corrib gas project
 Kinsale Head gas field

 Israel
 Noa North
 Mari
 Tamar gas field
 Dalit
 Leviathan gas field
 Sarah and Myra
 Dolphin
 Tanin gas field

 Italy
 Malossa field
 San Salvo field
 San Giorgio field
 Angeli field
 Cassiopea gas field

Japan
 Minami Kanto gas field (375×109 m³)

 Kazakhstan
 Karachaganak field
 Kisimbay field
 Kyzyloi Field
 Tengiz Field

 Lebanon
 Chekka
 Levant Basin Province (estimated total of this entire region ) within the territorial waters of Lebanon, Turkey, the Palestinian Gaza Strip, Israel, Syria, and Cyprus
 North Levant Basin

 Libya
 Khateyba

 Mauritania
 Chinguetti field (fairly large estimates)

 Mexico
 Reynosa gas field
 Chicontepec Field
 Tabasco
 Noxal oil field

 Mozambique
 Collier gas field

 Namibia
 Kudu gas field (1.3 – )

 Netherlands
 Annerveen gas field
 Groningen - also known as Slochteren
 L10 gas field

 New Zealand
 Maui gas field
 Pohokura field
 Kupe field
 Kapuni

 Nigeria
 Akpo
 Bonga Field

 North Sea
 Asgard field, Norway
 Amethyst gasfield
 Brent oilfield
 Dan field
 Easington Catchment Area
 Ekofisk oil field, Norway
 Everest gasfield
 Frigg gas field
 Gullfaks oil field
 Gullfaks Sor field
 Heimdal field
 Indefatigable field
 Kristin field
 Kvitebjon field
 Lemen Bank
 Mikkel field
 Eldfisk field
 Oseberg oil field, Norway
 Rhum gasfield
 Sleipner gas field
 Snorre oil field
 Statfjord oil field
 Troll, Norway
 Valhall oil field
 Viking field
 Visund field

 Norwegian Sea and Barents Sea (Norwegian part of the Barents Sea only)
 Heidrun oil field
 Ormen Lange, Norway
 Snøhvit, Norway
 Troll, Norway

 Pakistan (~1012m³)
 Adhi Oil and Gas Field
 Badin
 Bhit gas field
 Khasan gas field
 Kadanwari
 Kandkhot field
 Khan field
 Mari field
 Miano gas field
 Mizra field
 Qadirpur gas field
 Sawan Gas Field
 Sui gas field
 Toot gas field
 Ul Haq field
 Zamzama field

Palestine (Gaza)
 Gaza marine gas field

 Peru
 Camisea Gas Project

 Qatar
 North Field, Ras Laffan, exceeding 

 Romania (~600×109m³)
 Transylvania basin
 Filitelnic gas field
 Carpath oil basin
 Grădiştea gas field
 Mamu gas field
 Bacau oil basin
 Roman-Secuieni gas field
 Panonien basin

 Russia
 Urengoy gas field
 Yamburg gas field
 Bovanenkovskoe field
 Leningradskoye field
 Rusanovskoye field
 Zapolyarnoye gas field
 Shtokman field
 Arctic field
 Astrakhanskoye field
 West Kamchatka shelf
 Medvezhye field
 Yurubchen
 Kharasoveiskoye field
 Orenburgskoe field
 Kovykta field
 Kyrtael field
 Sakhalin-III
 Chayandinskoye field
 Angaro-Lenskoye field
 Central-Astrakhan field
 Yuzhno-Russkoye field
 South-Tambey field
 Krusenstern field
 North-Tambey field
 Kharampurskoye field
 Pestsovoe field
 Utrenneye field
 Malyginskoye field
 Yurkharovskoye field
 Harvutinskoye field
 North-Urengoy field
 Ledovoe field
 Samburg field
 Sakhalin-II
 Kamennomysskoye field
 Sakhalin-I
 Tasiyskoye field
 Yamsoveiskoye gas field
 East-Tarkosalinskoye field
 Aneryahinskoye field
 Gubkinskoye field
 Vuktyl
 Beregovoye field
 Yubileynoye field
 Hvalynskoye field
 Tarkosalinskoye
 North-Kamennomysskoye field
 Ety-Purovskoye Field
 Vyngapurovskoye field
 Nahodkinskoe field
 Pelyadkinskoe field
 Lyantorskoye field
 West-Astrakhan field
 Severo-Stavropolskoye field
 Nurminskoye field
 Ludlovskoye field
 Geophisicheskoye field
 Verhneviluchanskoye field
 Minkhovskoye field
 Novo Portovskoye field
 Yen-Yahinskoye field
 West-Siyakhinskoye field
 North-Komsomolskoye field
 Sredne-Tyugskoye field
 Soletsko-Khanaveyskoye field
 Layavozhskoye field
 Gydanskoye field
 Tas-Yuryakhskoye field
 Hancheiskoye field
 Verhnetiuteyskoye field
 Vyngayahinskoye field
 Myldzhinskoye field
 Messoyakha Gas Field

 Saudi Arabia
 Ghawar Field

 Saudi-Iraqi neutral zone
 Dorra

 Saudi-Kuwaiti neutral zone
 Safaniya-Khafji Field

 South Korea
 Donghae-1

 Syria
 Levant Basin province (estimated total of this entire region ) within the territorial waters of Syria, the Palestinian Gaza Strip, Israel, Lebanon, and Cyprus
 The Leviathan gas field located off the coast of Israel and Palestine (Gaza), and possibly Lebanon

 Taiwan
 Nushan

 Tajikistan
 Komsomolsk gas field

 Turkey
 Sakarya
 Tuna-1

 Turkmenistan
 Iolotan gas field
 Dauletabad gas field
 Shatlyk gas field
 Achak gas field
 South Gutliyak gas field

 Ukraine
 Efremovske field
 Shebeli field
 West-Khrestish field

 United Arab Emirates
 Rub Al Khali Province part of Rub Al Khali province is in the territory of the United Arab Emirates
 United States
 Anadarko Basin
 Barnett Shale [Newark East Gas Field]
 Carthage Gas Field
 Cisco Springs Oil Field (13-)
 Fayetteville Shale
 Gomez Gas Field
 Haynesville Shale
 Hugoton Natural Gas Area
 Jonah Gas Field
 Katy Gas Field
 Kettleman North Dome Oil Field
 Kenai Field
 Marcellus Shale (168-)×109m³)
 McFaddin Oil & Gas Field
 Mocane-Laverne Gas Area (Part of Anadarko Basin)
 Monroe Gas Field
 Old Ocean Gas Field
 Point Thomson
 Prudhoe Bay
 Rio Vista Gas Field
 South Pass Field
 Tom O'Connor Oil & Gas Field
 Vermilion Block 14
 Wamsutter Gas Field
 Uzbekistan
 Shurtan
 Gazli
 Zevardi
 Alan gas field
 Dengizkul-Khauzak (KKSK project)
 Kandym (KKSK project)
 Kokdamulak
 Urtabulak
 Urga/Kuanysh/Akchalak

 Venezuela
Deltana Platform; see also: Orinoco Belt
Perla gas field

 Vietnam
Baovang

By size
Sorted by size (*109 m³):
 Asalouyeh, South Pars Gas Field (10000 - 15000)
 Urengoy gas field (10200)
 Marcellus shale (4452-13674)
 Haynesville Shale (7079)
 Iolotan gas field (7000)
 Yamburg gas field (5242)
 Bovanenkovskoe field (4400)
 Leningradskoye field (4000)
 Rusanovskoye field (4000)
 Zapolyarnoye gas field (3500)
 Shtokman field (3200)
 Point Tomson (3000)
 Manas (3000)
 Groningen (2850)
 Astrakhanskoye field (2711)
 Anadarko Basin (2650)
 Hassi R'mel (2549)
 West Kamchatka shelf (2300)
 Medvezhye field (2200)
 Yurubchen (2100)
 Hugoton Natural Gas Area (2039)
 Kharasoveiskoye field (1900)
 Orenburgskoe field (1900)
 Kovykta field (1900)
 Karachaganak field, Kazakhstan (1800)
 Dauletabad gas field (1602)
 Jupiter gas field (1000-1600)
 Kyrtael field (1600)
 North Pars (1565)
 Kish Gas Field (1560)
 Ghawar Field (1500)
 Kyzyloi Field (1420)
 Pazanun (1415)
 Elsuort (more than 1400)
 Golshan Gas Field (1325)
 Troll (1325)
 Sakhalin-III (1300)
 Chayandinskoye field (1240)
 Angaro-Lenskoye field (1220)
 Shah Deniz gas field (1200)
 Central-Astrakhan field (1200)
 Shatlyk gas field (1200)
 Urtga/Kuanysh/Akchalak (1200)
 Shebeli field (1200)
 Chicontepec Field (1100)
 Greater Gorgon (1100)
 Dorra (1000)
 Yuzhno-Russkoye field (1000)
 South-Tambey field (1000)
 Dazhou (600)
 Krusenstern field (960)
 North-Tambey field (929)
 North West Shelf Venture (875)
 Kharampurskoye field (825)
 Mahakam gas field (822)
 Pestsovoe field (800)
 Utrenneye field (747)
 Malyginskoye field (745)
 Yurkharovskoye field (740)
 Prudhoe Bay, Alaska (736)
 Harvutinskoye field (700)
 Shurtan (634)
 North-Urengoy field (600)
 Jansz (570)
 Tabnak (562)
 leviathan (540)
 Sulige (534)
 Kangan (533)
 Avali (530)
 Samburg field (500)
 Sakhalin-II (500)
 Tangguh gas field (500)
 Kamennomysskoye field (500)
 Ledovoe field (500)
 Sakhalin-I (485)
 Gazli (477)
 Lemen Bank (460)
 Tasiyskoye field (440)
 Yamsoveiskoye gas field (436)
 Farsi (425)
 Ormen Lange (400)
 Aneryahinskoye field (400)
 Gubkinskoye field (400)
 Vuktyl (390)
 Minami Kanto gas field (375)
 Cisco Springs Oil Field (370)
 Katie field (362)
 Kettlemen Hills field (362)
 Kamrik (360)
 Kandkhot field (347)
 Nar (345)
 West-Khrestish field (335)
 Indefatigable field (333)
 Kopanoar (331)
 King Kristian (330)
 Safaniya-Khafji Field (327)
 Beregovoe field (324)
 Yubileynoye field (323)
 Hvalynskoye field (322)
 Tarkosalinskoye (322)
 Kisimbay field (310)
 North-Kamennomysskoye field (310)
 Aghar (307)
 Jonah Field (300)
 Ety-Purovskoye Field (300)
 Khangiran (300)
 Khateyba (300)
 Ahwaz Field (300)
 Baovang (300)
 Ferdowsi Gas Field (297)
 Komsomolsk gas field (296)
 Vyngapurovskoye field (290)
 Gomez gas field (283)
 Nahodkinskoe field (275)
 Pelyadkinskoe field (255)
 Lacq (250)
 Lyantorskoye field (250)
 West-Astrakhan field (250)
 Severo-Stavropolskoye field (229)
 Asgard field (226)
 Zawtica (225)
 Nurminskoye field (223)
 Zevardi (220)
 Ludlovskoye field (220)
 Geophisicheskoye field (210)
 Verhneviluchanskoye field (209)
 Minkhovskoye field (208)
 Novo Portovskoye field (200)
 Yen-Yahinskoye field (200)
 Frigg gas field (200)
 Hekla gas field (198)
 Shiyugou Dunxi (198)
 West-Siyakhinskoye field (190)
 North-Komsomolskoye field (186)
 Ekofisk oil field (185)
 Scott reef (180)
 Alan gas field (179)
 Sleipner gas field (174)
 Dengizkul-Khauzak (167)
 Amistad gas field (163)
 Sredne-Tyugskoye field (165)
 Peciko field (162)
 Deltana Platform (160)
 Soletsko-Khanaveyskoye field (155)
 Kandym (153)
 Kenai (152)
 Achak gas field (150)
 Albacora-Leste oil field (150)
 Kokdamulak (144)
 Drake Point (142)
 Tamar 1 (142)
 Mokane Lavern (140)
 Snøhvit (140)
 Layavozhskoye field (140)
 Arun gas field (125)
 Gydanskoye field (116)
 Tas-Yuryakhskoye field (112)
 Hancheiskoye (111)
 Efremovske field (110)
 Vyngayahinskoye field (107)
 Ras El Barr (106)
 Urtabulak (103)
 Oseberg oil field (102)
 Myldzhinskoye field (100)
 Marlin (100)
 Messoyakha Gas Field (100)
 Kudu gas field (34 – 240)
 Barnett Shale (60 - 900)
 Sui Gas Field (50-60)

See also

Oil fields
Giant oil and gas fields
List of countries by natural gas proven reserves
List of countries by natural gas production
National Oil Company

References

Natural gas fields
Natural gas fields

pt:Lista de usinas que produzem gás natural
ru:Месторождение природного газа